Mattoor  is a small town in Ernakulam district in the Indian state of Kerala.

Demographics 
 India census, Mattoor had a population of 17862 with 8864 males and 8998 females.

References 

Cities and towns in Ernakulam district